Jathedar Baba Hanuman Singh (1755 – 1846), also known as Akali Hanuman Singh or Amar Shaheed Baba Hanuman Singh, was a Nihang Sikh and was the 7th Jathedar of Budha Dal and Jathedar of Akal Takhat. He was the successor of Akali Phula Singh. He was the first one who fought against the British. He attained martyrdom during a battle with the British and Patiala State in 1845. In November 1755, he was born to Garja Singh and Harnam Kaur at Village Naurang Singh Wala, Zira, Ferozpur. At age of 68, he became Jathedar of Akal Takhat.

After defeat of Khalsa against British, Jathedar decided to re-group the Nihang Sikh army against the British at the Patiala Chauni.  Raja Karam Singh was ruler of Patiala and other Malwa Kingdom was in alliance with British. There were strict orders to shoot Nihangs on sight. When Jathedar Hanuman Singh arrived at Patiala, Raja Karam Singh launched a cannon attack on Nihangs, in which many Nihang Singhs were killed. Rest were forced to move to the forests nearby. Hanuman Singh and around 500 Nihang warriors survived this attack, and continued to fight the heavy cannon fire of the British, with swords, bows and arrows, axes and matchlock fire.

After the battle of Sabraon, the survivors of the Budha Dal sought out respite amongst the cis-Sutlej states south of the Sutlej river. Hanuman Singh received an invitation from the ruler of Patiala State, Narinder Singh.

Baba Hanuman Singh was wounded badly and died at Sohana, Mohali at the age of 90. He was succeeded by Jathedar Baba Parladh Singh Nihang Singh. His memorial, Gurdwara Singh Shaheedan, is situated in Sohana. A Kabaddi academy is present in Sohana in his name.

Gallery

References

Nihang
Indian Sikhs
People of the Sikh Empire
Punjabi people
Jathedars of Akal Takht
1755 births
1845 deaths